Michael MacGrath is an Irish lawyer who has served as a Judge of the High Court since 2018.

Early life 
MacGrath attended University College Dublin from where he received BCL and LLM degrees. He subsequently attended the King's Inns.

Legal career 
He was called to the Bar in 1984 and became a senior counsel in 2000. His practice was predominantly focused on civil law and commercial law.

He was counsel for the Barr Tribunal and he represented the Attorney General of Ireland and the public interest at the Moriarty Tribunal.

In addition to his legal practice, he was the chairperson of the Broadcasting Complaints Commission between 2005 and 2009, and was the chair of the Mining Board from 2013.

MacGrath was a tutor in law at University College Dublin. He was the editor of a text on engineering law in 1989. He has acted as the external examiner for Tort law the King's Inns since 2009.

Judicial career 
MacGrath was appointed to the High Court in January 2018. He was appointed following a vacancy created at the retirement of Henry Abbott.

He has presided over cases involving commercial law, regulatory law, judicial review, employment law, and medical negligence.

In the midst of a judicial review hearing in 2019, a lay litigant unsuccessfully attempted to effect a citizen's arrest against him. In 2019, he decided against the Friends of the Irish Environment which sought to challenge governmental policy on climate change and reducing carbon emissions. The decision was appealed to the Supreme Court of Ireland with a hearing in June 2020.

References 

Living people
High Court judges (Ireland)
Irish barristers
Alumni of University College Dublin
Alumni of King's Inns
Year of birth missing (living people)